Seas Shipping Company, owner of the Robin Line was founded in 1920 in New York City, New York. The Robin Line named all its ships starting with the word Robin. Robin Line was intercoastal fleet started as the predecessor of the Farrell Lines founded in 1948.  James A. Farrell, Jr., and John J. Farrell, sons of James Augustine Farrell, president of US Steel founded the Robin Line. Robin Line had two major stock holders the Lewis family and the Farrell family. In 1933, the two families ended their partnership and became rivals. The Robin line entered the Africa trade routes, competing against the Farrell Line. The two companies remained rivals until the death of Arthur W. Lewis, Jr. in 1954. Robin Line was sold to Moore-McCormack Lines in 1957.

During World War II  Seas Shipping Company was active in charter shipping with the Maritime Commission and War Shipping Administration.

Robin Line ports: New York, Walvis Bay, Luderitz, Cape Town, Port Elizabeth, East London, Durban, Lourenço Marques, Beira, Dar es Salaam, Tanga, Zanzibar, Mombasa, Tamatave, Majunga, other Madagascar ports, and Mauritius.

World War II
Seas Shipping Company ships were used to help the World War II effort. During World War II Seas Shipping Company operated Merchant navy ships for the United States Shipping Board. During World War II Sword Line, Inc. was active with charter shipping with the Maritime Commission and War Shipping Administration. Seas Shipping Company operated Liberty ships and Victory ships for the merchant navy. The ship was run by its Seas Shipping Company crew and the US Navy supplied United States Navy Armed Guards to man the deck guns and radio.

Ships
SS Eldena (1919)
SS Robin Doncaster  (owned 1948 to 1957)
type C2 ship with reefer storage and 12 passengers housing, for South Africa and East Africa service:
SS Robin Wentley 
SS Robin Locksley

SS Robin Tuxford
SS Robin Doncaster
SS Robin Kettering
SS Robin Sherwood
SS Robin Mowbray
SS Robin Goodfellow 
SS Robin Hood
SS Robin Trent
SS Robin Kirk
SS Robin Gray, scuttled in 1944 to make Omaha Beach breakwater.
SS Robin Mowbray
SS Robin Moor
  (owned 1947 to 1957)

World war II ships
 Victory ships:
SS Clovis Victory
SS Hibbing Victory
SS Gainesville Victory
SS Greenville Victory
SS Park Victory
 Liberty ship:
SS Robin Kettering
SS Arthur R. Lewis
 SS William Moultrie
SS Aquarama (post war work)
SS Sidney Lanier
SS James Gunn
SS Noah Brown
SS Irvin S. Cobb
SS Francis L. Lee
SS Nicholas Biddle
SS John Witherspoon
SS Ira Nelson Morris
SS Charles W. Stiles
SS Laura Bridgman
SS Amy Lowell 
SS Walter Colton
Other:
SS Empire Lynx, torpedoed November 3, 1942, sank by  while with Convoy SC 107.

See also

World War II United States Merchant Navy
James River, Reserve Fleet

References

Defunct shipping companies of the United States